Linux gaming refers to playing video games on a Linux operating system. Because many games are not natively supported for the Linux kernel, various software has been made to run Windows games, such as Wine, Cedega, and Proton, and managers such as Lutris and PlayOnLinux. The Linux gaming community has a presence on the internet with users who attempt to run games that are normally not supported on Linux. This includes a subreddit which has over 240k members as of January 2023.

History 

Linux gaming started largely as an extension of the already present Unix gaming scene, which dates back to that system's conception in 1969 with the game Space Travel and the first edition in 1971, with both systems sharing many similar titles. These games were mostly either arcade and parlour type games or text adventures using libraries like curses. A notable example of this are the "BSD Games", a collection of interactive fiction and other text-mode amusements. The free software and open source methodologies which spawned the development of the operating system in general also spawned the creation of various early free games.

Popular early titles included Netrek and the various XAsteroids, XBattle, XBill, XBoing, X-Bomber, XConq, XDigger, XEmeraldia, XEvil, XGalaga, XGammon, XLander, XLife, XMahjong, XMine, XSoldier, XPilot, XRobots, XRubiks, XShogi, XScavenger, XTris, XTron, XTic and XTux games using the X Window System. As the operating system itself grew and expanded, the amount of free and open-source games also increased in scale and complexity, with both clones of historically popular releases beginning with  BZFlag, LinCity, and FreeCiv, as well as original creations such as Rocks'n'Diamonds and Tux Racer.

1994–1997 

The beginning of Linux as a gaming platform for commercial video games is widely credited to have begun in 1994 when Dave D. Taylor ported the game Doom to Linux, as well as many other systems, during his spare time. From there he would also help found the development studio Crack dot Com, which released the video game Abuse, with the game's Linux port even being distributed by Linux vendor Red Hat. The studio's never finished Golgotha was also slated to be released by Red Hat in box. Ancient Domains of Mystery was also released for Linux in 1994 by Thomas Biskup, building on the roguelike legacy of games such as Moria and its descendent Angband, but more specifically Hack and NetHack.

id Software, the original developers of Doom, also continued to release their products for Linux. Their game Quake was ported to Linux via X11 in 1996, once again by Dave D. Taylor working in his free time. An SVGALib version was also later produced by Greg Alexander in 1997 using recently leaked source code, but was later mainlined by id. Later id products continued to be ported by Zoid Kirsch and Timothee Besset, a practice that continued until the studio's acquisition by ZeniMax Media in 2009. The ports of Quake and Quake II were released physically by Macmillan Computer Publishing USA, while Quake III was released for Linux by Loki Software.

In 1991 DUX Software contracted Don Hopkins to port SimCity to Unix, which he later ported to Linux and eventually released as open source for the OLPC XO Laptop. Other early commercial Linux games included Hopkins FBI, an adventure game released in 1998 by MP Entertainment, and Inner Worlds in 1996, which was released for and developed on Linux. In 1998, two programmers from Origin ported Ultima Online to Linux. The UNIX Book of Games, a 1996 publication by Janice Winsor, described various games for Unix with an accompanying CD-ROM containing executables and source code for Linux and SCO Unix.

A website called The Linux Game Tome, also known as HappyPenguin after its URL, was begun by Tessa Lau in 1995 to catalogue games created for or ported to Linux from the SunSITE game directories as well as other classic X11 games for a collection of just over 100 titles. It was taken over by Bob Zimbinski in 1998 eventually growing to over 2000 entries, sponsored by retailer Penguin Computing and later LGP until it went down in 2013, although mirrors still exist.

1998–2002 

The site LinuxGames covered news and commentary from November 1998 until its host Atomicgamer went down in 2015.

On November 9, 1998, a new software firm called Loki Software was founded by Scott Draeker, a former lawyer who became interested in porting games to Linux after being introduced to the system through his work as a software licensing attorney. Loki, although a commercial failure, is credited with the birth of the modern Linux game industry. Loki developed several free software tools, such as the Loki installer (also known as Loki Setup), and supported the development of the Simple DirectMedia Layer, as well as starting the OpenAL audio library project. These are still often credited as being the cornerstones of Linux game development. They were also responsible for bringing nineteen high-profile games to the platform before its closure in 2002.

Loki's initial success also attracted other firms to invest in the Linux gaming market, such as Tribsoft, Hyperion Entertainment, Macmillan Digital Publishing USA, Titan Computer, Xatrix Entertainment, Philos Laboratories, and Vicarious Visions. During this time Michael Simms founded Tux Games, one of the first online Linux game retailers, later followed by Fun 4 Tux, Wupra, ixsoft, and LinuxPusher.

The release of ScummVM in 2001, Dosbox in 2002, as well as video game console emulators like MAME from 1997 and released as open source in 2016, helped make Linux a viable platform for retro gaming (facilitated by the RetroArch frontend since 2010). This is especially the case for dedicated emulation setups built on single-board computers like the Raspberry Pi released in 2012, which are most often Linux based including with Raspberry Pi OS. Wine is also useful for running older Windows games, including 16-bit and even some 32-bit applications that no longer work on modern 64-bit Windows.

2003–2007 

After Loki's closure, the Linux game market experienced some changes. Although some new firms, such as Linux Game Publishing and RuneSoft, would largely continue the role of a standard porting house, the focus began to change with Linux game proponents encouraging game developers to port their game products themselves or through individual contractors. Influential to this was Ryan C. Gordon, a former Loki employee who would over the next decade port several game titles to multiple platforms, including Linux.

Around this time many companies, starting with id Software, also began to release legacy source code leading to a proliferation of source ports of older games to Linux and other systems. This also helped expand the already existing free and open-source gaming scene, especially with regards to the creation of free first person shooters. In addition, numerous game engine recreations have been produced to varying levels of accuracy using reverse engineering or underlying engine code supporting the original game files including on Linux and other niche systems.

The company TransGaming marketed as a monthly subscription its own proprietary fork of Wine called WineX in October 2001, later renamed Cedega in 2004 and discontinued in 2011, which aimed for greater compatibility with Microsoft Windows games. CodeWeavers also offered an enhanced version of Wine called CrossOver Games. The reliance on such compatibility layers remains controversial with concerns that it hinders growth in native development, although this approach was defended based on Loki's demise. PlayOnLinux, established in 2007, provides a community implementation.

2008–2011 

The Linux gaming market also started to experience some growth towards the end of the decade with the rise of independent video game development, with many "indie" developers favouring support for multiple platforms. The Humble Indie Bundle initiatives inaugurated in 2010 helped to formally demonstrate this trend, with Linux users representing a sizable population of their purchase base, as well as consistently being the most financially generous in terms of actual money spent.

In 2009, the small indie game company Entourev LLC published Voltley to Linux which is the first commercial exclusive game for this operating system. In the same year, LGP released Shadowgrounds which was the first commercial game for Linux using the Nvidia PhysX middleware. The GamingOnLinux website was launched on July 4, 2009 and eventually succeeded LinuxGames as the main source of news and commentary.

The release of a Linux version of Desura in 2011, a digital distribution platform with a primary focus on small independent developers, was heralded by several commentators as an important step to greater acknowledgement of Linux as a gaming platform. Shortly before this, Canonical launched the Ubuntu Software Center which also sold digital games. The digital store Gameolith also launched in 2011 focused principally on Linux before expanding in 2012 and closing in 2014.

2012–2016 

In July 2012, game developer and content distributor Valve announced a port of their Source engine for Linux as well as stating their intention to release their Steam digital distribution service for Linux. The potential availability of a Linux Steam client had already attracted other developers to consider porting their titles to Linux, including previously Mac OS only porting houses such as Aspyr Media and Feral Interactive.

In November 2012, Unity Technologies ported their Unity engine and game creation system to Linux starting with version 4. All of the games created with the Unity engine can now be ported to Linux easily.

In September 2013 Valve announced that they were releasing a gaming oriented Linux based operating system called SteamOS with Valve saying they had "come to the conclusion that the environment best suited to delivering value to customers is an operating system built around Steam itself." This was used for their Steam Machine platform released on November 10, 2015 and discontinued in 2018.

In March 2014 GOG.com announced they would begin to support Linux titles on their DRM free store starting the same year, after previously stating they would not be able due to too many distributions. GOG.com began their initial roll out on July 24, 2014, by offering 50 Linux supporting titles, including several new to the platform.

Despite previous statements, GOG have confirmed they have no plans to port their Galaxy client to Linux. The free software Lutris started in 2010, GameHub from 2019, MiniGalaxy from 2020, and the Heroic Games Launcher from 2021, offer support for GOG as well as the Epic Games Store, Ubisoft Connect and Origin.

In March and April 2014 two major developers Epic Games and Crytek announced Linux support for their next generation engines Unreal Engine 4 and CryEngine respectively.

Towards the end 2014 the game host itch.io announced that Linux would be supported with their developing open source game client. This was fully launched simultaneously on Windows, Mac OS X and Linux on December 15, 2015. The service had supported Linux since it was first unveiled on March 3, 2013, with creator Leaf Corcoran personally a Linux user. The similar Game Jolt service also supports Linux and has an open source client released on January 13, 2016. GamersGate also sells games for Linux.

2017-present 

On August 22, 2018, Valve released their fork of Wine called Proton, aimed at gaming. It features some improvements over the vanilla Wine such as Vulkan-based DirectX 11 implementation, Steam integration, better full screen and game controller support and improved performance for multi-threaded games. It has since grown to include support for DirectX 9 and DirectX 12 over Vulkan. The itch.io app added its own Wine integration in June 2020, while Lutris and PlayOnLinux are long-standing independent solutions for compatibility wrappers.

On February 25, 2022, Valve released Steam Deck, a handheld game console running SteamOS 3.0. The deployment of Proton and other design decisions were based on the limited response to their previous Steam Machines.

As of early 2023, the retro game store Zoom Platform was enhancing Linux support on their available titles.

Market share 

The Steam Hardware Survey reports that as of July 2021, 1% of users are using some form of Linux as their platform's primary operating system. The Unity game engine used to make their statistics available and in March 2016 reported that Linux users accounted for 0.4% of players. In 2010, in the first Humble Bundle sales, Linux accounted for 18% of purchases.

Supported hardware 

Linux as a gaming platform can also refer to operating systems based on the Linux kernel and specifically designed for the sole purpose of gaming. Examples are SteamOS, which is an operating system for Steam Machines, Steam Deck and general computers, video game consoles built from components found in the classical home computer, (embedded) operating systems like Tizen and Pandora, and handheld game consoles like GP2X, and Neo Geo X. The Nvidia Shield runs Android as an operating system, which is based on a modified Linux kernel.

The open source design of the Linux software platform allows the operating system to be compatible with various computer instruction sets and many peripherals, such as game controllers and head-mounted displays. As an example, HTC Vive, which is a virtual reality head-mounted display, supports the Linux gaming platform.

Performance 
In 2013, tests by Phoronix showed real-world performance of games on Linux with proprietary Nvidia and AMD drivers were mostly comparable to results on Windows 8.1. Phoronix found similar results in 2015, though Ars Technica described a 20% performance drop with Linux drivers.

Software architecture 
An operating system based on the Linux kernel and customized specifically for gaming, could adopt the vanilla Linux kernel with only little changes, or—like the Android operating system—be based on a relative extensively modified Linux kernel. It could adopt GNU C Library or Bionic or something like it. The entire middleware or parts of it, could very well be closed-source and proprietary software; the same is true for the video games. There are free and open-source video games available for the Linux operating system, as well as proprietary ones.

Linux kernel 
The subsystems already mainlined and available in the Linux kernel are most probably performant enough so to not impede the gaming experience in any way, however additional software is available, such as e.g. the Brain Fuck Scheduler (a process scheduler) or the Budget Fair Queueing (BFQ) scheduler (an I/O scheduler).

Similar to the way the Linux kernel can be, for example, adapted to run better on supercomputers, there are adaptations targeted at improving the performance of games. A project concerning itself with this issue is called Liquorix.

Available software for video game designers

Debuggers 

Several game development tools have been available for Linux, including GNU Debugger, LLDB, Valgrind, glslang and others. VOGL, a debugger for OpenGL was released on 12 March 2014. An open-source, cross-platform clone of Enterbrain's RPG Maker (2000, 2003, XP, VX), called OpenRPG Maker, is currently in development.

Available interfaces and SDKs 
There are multiple interfaces and Software Development Kits available for Linux, and almost all of them are cross-platform. Most are free and open-source software subject to the terms of the zlib License, making it possible to static link against them from fully closed-source proprietary software. One difficulty due to this abundance of interfaces, is the difficulty for programmers to choose the best suitable audio API for their purpose. The main developer of the PulseAudio project, Lennart Poettering, commented on this issue.
Physics engines, audio libraries, that are available as modules for game engines, have been available for Linux for a long time.

The book Programming Linux Games covers a couple of the available APIs suited for video game development for Linux, while The Linux Programming Interface covers the Linux kernel interfaces in much greater detail.

Available middleware 
Beside majority of the software which acts as an interface to various subsystems of the operating system, there is also software which can be simply described as middleware. A multitude of companies exist worldwide, whose main or only product is software that is meant to be licensed and integrated into a game engine. Their primary target is the video game industry, but the film industry also utilizes such software for special effects. Some very few well known examples are
 classical physics: Havok, Newton Game Dynamics and PhysX
 audio: Audiokinetic Wwise, FMOD
 other: SpeedTree
A significant share of the available middleware already runs natively on Linux, only a very few run exclusively on Linux.

Available IDEs and source code editors 
Numerous source code editors and IDEs are available for Linux, among which are Visual Studio Code, Sublime Text, Code::Blocks, Qt Creator, Emacs, or Vim.

Multi-monitor 
A multi-monitor setup is supported on Linux at least by AMD Eyefinity & AMD Catalyst, Xinerama and RandR on both X11 and Wayland. Serious Sam 3: BFE is one example of a game that runs natively on Linux and supports very high resolutions and is validated by AMD to support their Eyefinity. Civilization V is another example, it even runs on a "Kaveri" desktop APU in 3x1 portrait mode.

Voice over IP 
The specifications of the Mumble protocol are freely available and there are BSD-licensed implementations for both servers and clients. The positional audio API of Mumble is supported by e.g. Cube 2: Sauerbraten.

Wine 

Wine is a compatibility layer that provides binary compatibility and makes it possible to run software, that was written and compiled for Microsoft Windows, on Linux. The Wine project hosts a user-submitted application database (known as Wine AppDB) that lists programs and games along with ratings and reviews which detail how well they run with Wine. Wine AppDB also has a commenting system, which often includes instructions on how to modify a system to run a certain game which cannot run on a normal or default configuration. Many games are rated as running flawlessly, and there are also many other games that can be run with varying degrees of success. The use of Wine for gaming has proved controversial in the Linux community as some feel it is preventing, or at least hindering, the further growth of native gaming on the platform.

Emulators 

There are numerous emulators for Linux. There are also APIs, virtual machines, and machine emulators that provide binary compatibility:

 Anbox and Waydroid for the Android operating system;
 Basilisk II for the 68040 Macintosh;
 DOSBox and DOSEMU for MS-DOS/PC DOS and compatibles;
 DeSmuME and melonDS for the Nintendo DS;
 Dolphin for the Nintendo GameCube, Wii, and the Triforce;
 FCEUX, Nestopia and TuxNES for the Nintendo Entertainment System;
 Frotz for Z-Machine text adventures;
 Fuse for the Sinclair ZX Spectrum;
 Hatari for the Atari ST, STe, TT and Falcon;
 gnuboy for the Nintendo Game Boy and Game Boy Color;
 MAME for arcade games (and previously MESS for multiple hardware platforms);
 Mednafen and Xe emulating multiple hardware platforms including some of the above;
 Mupen64Plus and the no longer actively developed original Mupen64 for the Nintendo 64;
 PCSX-Reloaded, pSX and the Linux port of ePSXe for the PlayStation;
 Neko Project for the NEC PC-9801;
 PCSX2 for the PlayStation 2;
 PPSSPP for the PlayStation Portable;
 ScummVM for LucasArts and various other adventure games;
 SheepShaver for the PowerPC Macintosh;
 Snes9x, higan and ZSNES for the Super NES;
 Stella for the Atari 2600;
 UAE for the Amiga;
 VICE for the Commodore 64, 128, VIC-20, Plus/4 and PET;
 VisualBoyAdvance, mGBA and Boycott Advance for the Game Boy Advance;
 Mini vMac and the no longer actively developed original vMac for the 680x0 Macintosh;

Linux homebrew on consoles 

Linux has been ported to several game consoles, including the Xbox, PlayStation 2, PlayStation 3, PlayStation 4, GameCube, and Wii which allows game developers without an expensive game development kit to access console hardware. Several gaming peripherals also work with Linux.

Linux adoption

Adoption by game engines 

The game engine is the software solely responsible for the game mechanics, or rules defining game play. There are different game engines for first-person shooters, strategy video games, etc. Besides the game mechanics, software is also needed to handle graphics, audio, physics, input handling, and networking.

Game engines that are used by many video games and run on top of Linux include:
 C4 Engine (Terathon Software)
 CryEngine (Crytek)
 Diesel 2.0 (Grin)
 HPL Engine 1–3 (Frictional Games)
 id Tech (id Software)
 Serious Engine (Croteam)
 Source (Valve)
 Unigine (Unigine Corp)
 Unity 5 (Unity Technologies)
 Unreal Engine 1-4 (Epic Games)
 Godot engine

Adoption by video games 

There are many free and open-source video games as well as commercially distributed proprietary video games that run natively on Linux. Some independent companies have also begun porting prominent video games from Microsoft Windows to Linux.

Free and open-source games

Original games 

A few original open source video games have attained notability:

 0 A.D. is a real-time strategy game of ancient warfare, similar to Age of Empires.
 AssaultCube is a first-person shooter.
 AstroMenace is a 3D scroll-shooter.
 BZFlag is a 3D First person tank shooter (With jumping).
 Battle for Wesnoth is a turn-based strategy game.
 Blob Wars: Metal Blob Solid is a 2D platform game.
 Chromium B.S.U. is a fast-paced, arcade-style, top-scrolling space shooter.
 CodeRED: Alien Arena is a sci-fi first-person shooter derived from the Quake II engine.
 Crimson Fields is a turn-based tactical wargame.
 Cube 2: Sauerbraten is a 3D first-person shooter with an integrated map editing mode.
 Danger from the Deep is a submarine simulator set in World War II.
 Glest is a real-time strategy game, with optional multiplayer.
 NetHack and Angband are text-based computer role-playing games.
 Netrek is a Star Trek themed multiplayer 2D space battle game.
 Nexuiz is a first-person shooter. Although, this has been replaced by Xonotic.
 Project: Starfighter a multi-directional, objective based shoot-em-up.
 TORCS (The Open Racing Car Simulator) – considered one of the best open-source racing simulators, with realistic graphics and vehicle handling.
 Tremulous is a 3D first-person shooter/real-time strategy game.
 Tux Racer is a 3D racing game featuring Tux.
 Urban Terror is a standalone Quake III Arena first-person shooter. (Proprietary mod).
 Vega Strike is a space flight simulation.
 Warsow is a Quake-like, fast-paced first-person shooter.

Clones and remakes 

There are a larger number of open source clones and remakes of classic games:

 FreeCiv is a clone of Civilization II.
 FreeOrion is inspired by Master of Orion.
 Frets on Fire is a clone of Guitar Hero.
 Frozen Bubble is a clone of Puzzle Bobble.
 Grid Wars is a clone of Geometry Wars.
 Head Over Heels, a ZX-Spectrum action platformer, was remade for Linux, Windows, Mac OS X, and BeOS.
 Oolite is a free and open-source remake of Elite.
 OpenClonk is a free and open-source remake of Clonk.
 OpenTTD is a remake of Transport Tycoon Deluxe.
 OpenMW game engine reimplementation of Morrowind.
 Performous is a remix of the ideas behind Guitar Hero, SingStar and Dance Dance Revolution.
 Pingus is a clone of Lemmings.
 Scorched 3D is a 3D adaptation of Scorched Earth.
 Spring originally is a clone of Total Annihilation, but actually is a platform for real time strategy games.
 StepMania is a clone of Dance Dance Revolution
 SuperTuxKart and TuxKart are clones of Mario Kart.
 SuperTux and Secret Maryo Chronicles are both clones of Super Mario Bros.
 The Dark Mod is a stealth game inspired by the Thief (series) games (particularly 1 and 2) from Looking Glass Studios
 The Zod Engine is an actively developed open source remake of the game Z.
 UFO: Alien Invasion is heavily influenced by the X-COM series, mostly by UFO: Enemy Unknown.
 UltraStar is an open source clone of SingStar
 Ur-Quan Masters is based on the original source code for Star Control II
 Warzone 2100 is a real-time strategy and real-time tactics hybrid computer game. Originally published by Eidos Interactive and later released as open source.
 Widelands is a clone of The Settlers II.
 Bill Kendrick has developed many free software games, most inspired by games for the Atari 8-bit and other classic systems.

Proprietary games

Available on Steam 

Valve officially released Steam for Linux on February 14, 2013.  the number of Linux-compatible games on Steam exceeds 6,500. With the launch of SteamOS, a distribution of Linux made by Valve intended to be used for HTPC gaming, that number is quickly growing. Listed below are some notable games available on Steam for Linux:

 Age of Wonders III
 Alien: Isolation
 American Truck Simulator
 And Yet It Moves
 Another World
 Aquaria
 Bastion
 The Binding of Isaac
 BioShock Infinite
 Borderlands 2
 Borderlands: The Pre-Sequel!
 Braid
 Brütal Legend
 Cave Story+
 Civilization V
 Civilization VI
 Civilization: Beyond Earth
 Counter-Strike
 Counter-Strike: Global Offensive
 Counter-Strike: Source
 Day of the Tentacle Remastered
 Dead Island
 Deus Ex: Mankind Divided
 Dirt Rally
 Don't Starve
 Dota 2
 Empire: Total War
 Fez
 Freedom Planet
 GRID Autosport
 Grim Fandango Remastered
 Half-Life
 Half-Life 2
 Hitman
 Hitman Go
 Kerbal Space Program
 Lara Croft Go
 Left 4 Dead 2
 Life Is Strange
 Life Is Strange 2
 Limbo
 Mad Max
 Madout Big City Online
 Metro 2033
 Metro: Last Light
 Middle-earth: Shadow of Mordor
 Mini Metro
 Pillars of Eternity
 Portal
 Portal 2
 Rocket League
 Saints Row 2
 Saints Row IV
 Saints Row: The Third
 Shovel Knight
 Skullgirls
 Spec Ops: The Line
 Star Wars Knights of the Old Republic II: The Sith Lords
 Super Meat Boy
 System Shock 2
 The Talos Principle
 Tank Force
 Team Fortress 2
 Tomb Raider
 Total War: Warhammer
 TowerFall Ascension
 Undertale
 VVVVVV
 The Witcher 2: Assassins of Kings
 XCOM: Enemy Unknown
 XCOM 2

Independent game developers 

Independent developer 2D Boy released World of Goo for Linux. Role-playing video game titles like Eschalon: Book I, Eschalon: Book II and Penny Arcade Adventures: On the Rain-Slick Precipice of Darkness were developed cross-platform from the start of development, including a Linux version. Sillysoft released Linux versions of their game Lux and its various versions, as did My Game Company and its Dirk Dashing series.

Hemisphere Games has released a Linux version of Osmos. Koonsolo has released a Linux version of Mystic Mine. Amanita Design released Linux versions of Machinarium and Samorost 2. Irrgheist released a Linux version of their futuristic racing game H-Craft Championship before later releasing the source code. Gamerizon released a Linux version of QuantZ. InterAction Studios ported several titles mostly in the Chicken Invaders series. GridWars was released for Linux by Canadian developer Marco Inciti.

Kristanix Games released Linux versions of Crossword Twist, Fantastic Farm, Guess The Phrase!, Jewel Twist, Kakuro Epic, Mahjong Epic, Maxi Dice, Solitaire Epic, Sudoku Epic, and Theseus and the Minotaur. Anawiki Games released Linux versions of Path of Magic, Runes of Avalon, Runes of Avalon 2, Soccer Cup Solitaire, The Perfect Tree and Dress-Up Pups. Gaslamp Games released a Linux version of Dungeons of Dredmor. Broken Rules released a Linux version of And Yet It Moves.

Frictional Games released Linux versions of both Penumbra: Black Plague and Penumbra: Overture, as well as the expansion pack Penumbra: Requiem. They also released Amnesia: The Dark Descent for Linux simultaneously with the Windows and Mac OS X versions, a practice they have since continued. S2 Games released Linux clients for their titles Savage: The Battle for Newerth, Savage 2: A Tortured Soul and Heroes of Newerth. Wolfire Games released a Linux version of their game Lugaru  and supported its sequel Overgrowth on Linux; David Rosen's  earlier Black Shades was also ported to Linux via released source code. Arctic Paint released a Linux version of Number Drill. Charlie's Games has released a Linux version of Bullet Candy Perfect, Irukandji, Space Phallus and Scoregasm.

Illwinter Game Design released Conquest of Elysium II, Dominions: Priests, Prophets and Pretenders, Dominions II: The Ascension Wars, and Dominions 3: The Awakening for Linux. Introversion Software released Darwinia, Uplink, and DEFCON. Cartesian Theatre is a Vancouver, British Columbia, Canada, based software house specializing in free, commercial, games for Linux, most notably Avaneya. Kot-in-Action Creative Artel released their Steel Storm games for Linux. Hazardous Software have released their game Achron for Linux.

UNIGINE Company developed Oil Rush using its Unigine engine technology that works on Linux. Unigine Corp was also developing a "shooter-type game" that would have been released for Linux, but development was later frozen while OilRush developed. The MMORPG game Syndicates of Arkon was also supposed to come to Linux. The game Dilogus: The Winds of War was also being developed with Unigine and was planned to have a Linux client. Cradle was released for Linux in 2015, as was Sumoman in 2017.

A number of visual novel developers support Linux. Winter Wolves released titles such as Spirited Heart, Heileen, The Flower Shop, Bionic Heart, Card Sweethearts, Vera Blanc, Planet Stronghold, and Loren The Amazon Princess for Linux. Hanako Games released Science Girls, Summer Session, Date Warp, Cute Knight Kingdom, and were considering porting Fatal Hearts to Linux. sakevisual brought Jisei, Kansei, Yousei, RE: Alistair and Ripples to Linux. Four Leaf Studios also released Katawa Shoujo for Linux and Christine Love released Digital: A Love Story, both of which, along with Summer Session mentioned previously, are powered by the free software Ren'Py game engine.

The Java-based sandbox game Minecraft by then indie developer Mojang is available on Linux, as are any other video games compiled for the Java virtual machine. Linux support was maintained even following Mojang's purchase by Microsoft in November 2014.

Dwarf Fortress, a sandbox management simulator / roguelike, has been made available for Linux by Tarn Adams. 

The voxel-based space sandbox game, ScrumbleShip by indie developer Dirkson was under development for Linux, Mac OS X, and Windows.

The realistic replay baseball simulation Out of the Park Baseball by OOTP Developments was made available for Linux, Mac OS X, and Windows, for single player and multiplayer online leagues.

Grappling Hook, a first-shooter like puzzle game using the jMonkeyEngine, was released by Christian Teister.

The German indie-studio Pixel Maniacs released both of their games, ChromaGun and Can't Drive This for Linux.

In the walking simulator space, Dan Ruscoe's Dark Hill Museum of Death is available for Linux, as well as the better known Gone Home, The Stanley Parable, Jazzpunk, Firewatch and Proteus. Blendo Games has released their games, including Gravity Bone, Thirty Flights of Loving and Quadrilateral Cowboy built on the open source id Tech code, for Linux.

Game porters 

Independent companies have also taken on the task of porting prominent Windows games to Linux. Loki Software was the first such company, and between 1998 and 2002 ported Civilization: Call to Power, Descent³, Eric's Ultimate Solitaire, Heavy Gear II,
Heavy Metal: F.A.K.K.², Heretic II, Heroes of Might and Magic III, Kohan: Immortal Sovereigns, Myth II: Soulblighter, Postal, Railroad Tycoon II, Quake III Arena, Rune, Sid Meier's Alpha Centauri, Sim City 3000, Soldier of Fortune, Tribes 2, and MindRover to Linux.

Tribsoft created a Linux version of Jagged Alliance 2 by Sir-Tech Canada before shutting down in 2002. Linux Game Publishing was founded in 2001 in response to the impending demise of Loki, and has brought Creatures: Internet Edition, Candy Cruncher, Majesty: Gold Edition, NingPo MahJong, Hyperspace Delivery Boy!, Software Tycoon, Postal²: Share The Pain, Soul Ride, X2: The Threat, Gorky 17, Cold War, Knights and Merchants: The Shattered Kingdom, Ballistics, X3: Reunion, Jets'n'Guns, Sacred: Gold, Shadowgrounds, and Shadowgrounds Survivor to Linux. Some of these games were ported for them by Gordon.

LGP-associated but freelance consultant Frank C. Earl is porting the game Caster to Linux and has released the first episode and also developed the Linux version of Cortex Command being included in the second Humble Indie Bundle. He is also working towards other porting projects such as the entire Myth series. He is largely taking recommendations and he comments as part of the Phoronix community. icculus.org has ported beta releases for Medal of Honor: Allied Assault and Devastation, versions of America's Army, and the titles Prey, Aquaria, Braid, Hammerfight and Cogs.

The German publisher RuneSoft was founded in 2000. They ported the games Northland,
Robin Hood: The Legend of Sherwood, Airline Tycoon Deluxe, Ankh, Ankh: Heart of Osiris, Barkanoid 2, and Jack Keane to Linux, as well as porting Knights and Merchants: The Shattered Kingdom and Software Tycoon, for Linux Game Publishing. Hyperion Entertainment ported games to several systems, they have ported Shogo: Mobile Armor Division and SiN to Linux, as well as porting Gorky 17 for Linux Game Publishing. Wyrmkeep Entertainment has brought the games The Labyrinth of Time and Inherit the Earth: Quest for the Orb to Linux. Alternative Games brought Trine and Shadowgrounds, and Shadowgrounds Survivor for Linux Game Publishing.

Aspyr Media released their first Linux port in June 2014, they claim they are porting to Linux due to Valve bringing out SteamOS. Aspyr Media later ported Borderlands 2 to Linux in September 2014.

Having ported games to the Macintosh since 1996, video game publisher Feral Interactive released XCOM: Enemy Unknown, its first game for Linux, in June 2014. Feral Interactive stated they port games to Linux thanks to SteamOS.

Other developers 

Some id Software employees ported the Doom series, the Quake series, Return to Castle Wolfenstein, Wolfenstein: Enemy Territory and Enemy Territory: Quake Wars. Some games published by GarageGames which have Linux versions include Bridge Builder, Marble Blast Gold, Gish, Tribal Trouble, and Dark Horizons: Lore Invasion.

MP Entertainment released Hopkins FBI and Crack dot com released Abuse for Linux, becoming one of the first developers to release a native port. Inner Worlds, another early commercial Linux title, was released for and developed on Linux. Philos Laboratories released a Linux version of Theocracy on the retail disk. Absolutist has supported Linux for a number of years. GLAMUS GmbH released a Linux version of their game Mobility. Vicarious Visions ported the space-flight game Terminus to Linux.

Mountain King Studios released a port of Raptor: Call of the Shadows. BlackHoleSun Software released Krilo, Bunnies and Aftermath, and worked on Atlantis: The Underwater City - Interactive Storybook.

Lava Lord Games released their game Astro Battle for Linux. Xatrix Entertainment released a Linux version of Kingpin: Life of Crime. BioWare released Neverwinter Nights for Linux. Croteam released the Serious Sam series, with the first game ported by Gordon and with the second self-ported. Gordon also ported Epic Games' shooter games Unreal Tournament 2003 and Unreal Tournament 2004.

Revolution System Games released their game Decadence: Home Sweet Home through Steam only for Linux for a period of time after Mac or windows release.

On 12 October 2013 Lars Gustavsson, creative director at DICE, said to polygon.com

Commercial games for non-x86 instruction sets 

Some companies ported games to Linux running on instruction sets other than x86, such as Alpha, PowerPC, Sparc, MIPS or ARM.

Loki Entertainment Software ported Civilization: Call to Power, Eric's Ultimate Solitaire, Heroes of Might and Magic III, Myth II: Soulblighter, Railroad Tycoon II Gold Edition and Sid Meier's Alpha Centauri with Alien Crossfire expansion pack to Linux PowerPC. They also ported Civilization: Call to Power, Eric's Ultimate Solitaire, Sid Meier's Alpha Centauri with Alien Crossfire expansion pack to Linux Alpha and Civilization: Call to Power, Eric's Ultimate Solitaire to Linux SPARC.

Linux Game Publishing published Candy Cruncher, Majesty Gold, NingPo MahJong and Soul Ride to Linux PowerPC. They also ported Candy Cruncher, Soul Ride to Linux SPARC and Soul Ride to Linux Alpha.

Illwinter Game Design ported Dominions: Priests, Prophets and Pretenders, Dominions II: The Ascension Wars and Dominions 3 to Linux PowerPC, as well as Conquest of Elysium 3, Dominions 4: Thrones of Ascension to Raspberry Pi.

Hyperion Entertainment ported Sin to Linux PowerPC published by Titan Computer and Gorky 17 to Linux PowerPC which later was published by LGP.

Runesoft hired Gunnar von Boehn which ported Robin Hood – The Legend of Sherwood to Linux PowerPC. Later Runesoft ported Airline Tycoon Deluxe to Raspberry Pi was running Debian GNU/Linux.

Source ports 

Several developers have released the source code to many of their legacy titles, allowing them to be run as native applications on many alternative platforms, including Linux. Examples of games which were ported to Linux this way include Duke Nukem 3D, Shadow Warrior, Rise of the Triad, Blake Stone, Ken's Labyrinth, Catacomb 3D, Seven Kingdoms, Warzone 2100, Homeworld, Call to Power II, Wolfenstein 3D, Heretic, Hexen, Hexen II, Aliens versus Predator, Descent, Descent II and Freespace 2. Several game titles that were previously released for Linux were also able to be expanded or updated because of the availability of game code, including Doom, Abuse, Quake, Quake II, Quake III Arena and Jagged Alliance 2. Some derivatives based on released source code have also been released for Linux, such as Aleph One and Micropolis for Marathon 2: Durandal and SimCity respectively.

Certain game titles were even able to be ported due to availability of shared engine code even though the game's code itself remains proprietary or otherwise unavailable, such as the video game Strife, Blood, PowerSlave, Redneck Rampage, or the multiplayer component of Star Trek: Voyager – Elite Force. Some games have even been ported entirely or partially by reverse engineering and game engine recreation such as WarCraft II through Wargus or Commander Keen. Another trick is to attempt hacking the game to work as a mod on another native title, such as with the original Unreal. Additionally, some games can be run through the use of Linux specific runtime environments, such as the case of certain games made with Adventure Game Studio such as the Chzo Mythos or certain titles made with the RPG Maker tool. Games derived from released code, with both free and proprietary media, that are released for Linux include Urban Terror, OpenArena, FreeDoom, World of Padman, Nexuiz/Xonotic, War§ow, The Dark Mod, and Excalibur: Morgana's Revenge.

Massively multiplayer online role-playing games 

This is a selected list of MMORPGs that are native on Linux:

 A Tale in the Desert III (2003, eGenesis) – A trading and crafting game, set in ancient Egypt, pay-to-play.
 Crossfire (1992) – A medieval fantasy 2D game.
 Dofus (2005, Ankama Games) – A 2D fantasy MMORPG.
 PlaneShift – A free 3D fantasy game.
 Regnum Online – A 3D fantasy game, free-to-play with premium content.
 RuneScape – Java fantasy 3rd person MMORPG.
 Salem – An isometric, 3D fantasy game with a focus on crafting and permadeath.
 Shroud of the Avatar – An isometric, 3D fantasy game and the spiritual successor to Ultima Online.
 Spiral Knights – Java fantasy 3rd person game.
 The Saga of Ryzom – has a Linux client and source code available.
 Tibia – A 2D Medieval fantasy MMORPG game. Free-to-play with premium content. One of the oldest MMORPG, created January 1997. With Official Linux client.
 Ultima Online has an unofficial Linux client.
 Vendetta Online – A 3D spacecraft MMOFPS with growing RPG elements, pay to play. Maintains both Linux/32 and Linux/64 clients.
 WorldForge – A game engine. There are Linux clients available.
 Wyvern – A 2D fantasy MMORPG that runs on Java.
 Yohoho! Puzzle Pirates – A puzzle game which runs on Java.
 Many Virtual Worlds – (such as Second Life) also have Linux clients.

Types of Linux gaming

Libre gaming
Libre gaming is a form of Linux gaming that emphasizes libre software, which often includes levels and assets as well as code.

Native gaming
Native gaming is a form of Linux gaming that emphasizes using only native games or ports and not using emulators or compatibility layers.

DRM-free gaming
DRM-free gaming is a form of Linux gaming that emphasizes boycotting DRM technologies. This can include buying games from GOG.com, certain Humble Bundles or itch.io and avoiding Steam and similar services.

Terminal gaming
Terminal gaming is the playing of text-based games from within a console, often programmed within Bash or using libraries such as ncurses.

Retro gaming
Retrogaming is the playing of older games using emulators such as MAME or Dosbox, compatibility layers such as Wine and Proton, engine reimplementations and source ports, or even older Linux distributions (including live CDs and live USB, or virtual machines), original binaries,
and period hardware.

Live gaming
A number of games can be played from live distributions such as Knoppix, allowing easy access for users unwilling to fully commit to Linux. Certain live distros have specially targeted gamers, such as SuperGamer and Linux-Gamers.

Browser gaming 
Browser gaming is the act of playing online games through a web browser, which has the advantage of largely being platform independent. The same largely applies to social network games hosted on social media sites. Older games were largely based on Adobe Flash, while modern ones are mostly HTML5.

Cloud gaming 
Cloud gaming is the streaming of games from a central server onto a desktop client. This is another way to play games on Linux that are not natively supported, although some cloud services, such as the erstwhile Google Stadia, are hosted on Linux and Android servers. GamingAnywhere is an open source implementation.

On Windows
Although less exploited than the reverse, as few programs are Linux exclusive, support does exist for running Linux binaries from Windows. The Windows Subsystem for Linux allows the running of both command line and graphical Linux applications from Windows 10 and Windows 11. An earlier implementation is Cygwin, started by Cygnus Solutions and later maintained by Red Hat, although it has limited hardware access and required adaptation. The use of Wine can even allow for the running of Windows games on Linux from Windows. The LibTAS library for tool assisted speedruns currently recommends WSL to run on Windows. Naughty Dog meanwhile have used Cygwin to run old command-line tools for use in their game development, which is a broader use for the platform. As with running Windows applications on Linux, there is controversy over whether running Linux applications on Windows will dilute interest in Linux as distinct platform, though it has speciality uses.

BSD gaming
Owing to a common Unix-like heritage and free software ethos, many games for Linux are also ported to BSD variants or can be ran using compatibility layers such as Linuxulator. The Homura launcher exists to facilitate running Windows games through Wine, which can still be used standalone. A 2011 benchmark by Phoronix even found certain speed advantages over running games on Linux itself, comparing PC-BSD 8.2 to Ubuntu 11.04. The permissive licensing of BSD has also lead to its inclusion in the system software of several game consoles, such as the Sony Playstation line and the Nintendo Switch.

Unix gaming 

A further niche exists for running games, either through ports or lxrun, on Solaris and derivatives such as OpenIndiana, Darwin distributions such as PureDarwin, Coherent, SerenityOS, or on Minix and Hurd based systems. There has been some cross-pollination with purely proprietary Unix derivatives, such as AIX, QNX, Domain/OS, HP-UX, IRIX (see here), Xenix, SCO Unix, Unixware, Tru64 UNIX, LynxOS (which features inbuilt Linux compatibility), Ultrix, z/OS UNIX System Services, and even A/UX. The games Doom and Quake were developed by id Software on NeXTStep, a forerunner of modern macOS, before being ported to DOS and back to numerous other Unix variants.

See also 

 Directories and lists
 Free Software Directory
 List of emulators
 List of open source games
 List of video game console emulators
 Linux gaming software
 Direct3D (alternative implementation)
 Lutris
 PlayOnLinux
 Proton (software)
 Steam (service)
 Vulkan (API)
 Wine (software)
 Other articles
 Linux for PlayStation 2
 Sega Lindbergh

References 

Gaming
 
 
Video game platforms